Ascaltis pelliculata is a species of sea sponge in the family Leucascidae, first described as Leucoselenia pelliculata by Arthur Dendy in 1891. it is found in the coastal waters of Victoria.

References 

Clathrinida
Sponges described in 1891
Taxa named by Arthur Dendy